Jordan Hall is a Canadian writer, playwright and web series creator, best known for creating the award-winning web series Carmilla.

Early life 
Hall was born in Hamilton, Ontario, Canada, where she grew up with three brothers, and where she attended McMaster University. After moving to the west coast, she joined the rank and file of the University of British Columbia in the Creative Writing MFA program.

Career

Carmilla 
In 2013, Jordan co-created the CSA-winning web series Carmilla for SmokeBomb Entertainment.

The series premiered on the Vervegirl (rebranded as 'KindaTV' as of January 2016) YouTube channel on August 19, 2014.U by Kotex is the executive producer of the web series. The series takes place at the fictional Silas University in Styria, Austria and is told through video journals (Vlogs) recorded by Laura, a first-year student. The first and second seasons each consist of 36 three to seven-minute episodes. A twelve-episode prequel mini-season, "season zero," was announced just after the release of the final episode of season 2.

On February 13, 2016, it was announced that Carmilla will air its third and final season in the summer of 2016. In 2016, the series won a Rockie Award for Branded Content at the Banff World Media Festival.

Theatre work 
Her first full-length play, Kayak, won Samuel French's 2010 Canadian Playwrights Competition, and has been produced to critical acclaim across North America. Her most recent play, How to Survive an Apocalypse, will premiere with Touchstone in 2016.

Accolades 
In 2011, Hall won the Crazy8s Short Film Production Competition.

References 

Canadian women dramatists and playwrights
21st-century Canadian dramatists and playwrights
Living people
21st-century Canadian women writers
Writers from Hamilton, Ontario
Academic staff of Capilano University
Year of birth missing (living people)